Orest Mykhaylovych Kostyk (born 16 April 1999) is a Ukrainian professional footballer who plays as a goalkeeper for Metalist Kharkiv.

Career
Kostyk is a product of the Karpaty Lviv youth sportive school system.

After playing at the amateurs level, he was signed by professional Veres Rivne in 2018, but not made a debut for the main-squad of this team. Kostyk was signed by Lviv in February 2020 and made his debut for main-squad in the drawing away match against Rukh Lviv on 3 October 2020 in the Ukrainian Premier League.

References

External links
 
 

1999 births
Living people
Sportspeople from Lviv Oblast
Ukrainian footballers
Association football goalkeepers
FC Sokil Zolochiv players
FC Nyva Ternopil players
NK Veres Rivne players
FC Lviv players
FK Jonava players
FC Metalist Kharkiv players
Ukrainian Premier League players
A Lyga players
Ukrainian expatriate footballers
Expatriate footballers in Lithuania
Ukrainian expatriate sportspeople in Lithuania